The Iraqi Academy of Sciences (Arabic: المجمع العلمي العراقي) is an academy in Baghdad founded in 1948 in order to develop and regulate the Arabic language in Iraq and the Arab World.

The Academy also has two other departments to regulate and develop Kurdish and Aramaic (Syriac) in Iraq; those two departments were founded in 1963.

It was looted during the 2003 invasion of Iraq.

See also 
 List of language regulators

References

External links 
 Homepage in Arabic

 
Language regulators
Arabic language
Arabic language regulators
Aramaic languages
Kurdish language
National academies of sciences
1948 establishments in Iraq
Scientific organizations established in 1948
Science and technology in Iraq
Scientific organizations based in Iraq